In the United States, there are three classes of medical certifications for pilots; such certificates are required to legally exercise the privileges of a Pilot exercising the privileges of either a Private, Commercial, or Airline Transport Pilot license.  Medical Certificates are not needed for Glider, Balloon, Recreational, or Sport Pilot certifications.  Each certificate must be issued by a doctor approved by the Federal Aviation Administration to a person of stable physical and mental health.

Types
The three kinds are:

Third Class Medical Certificate:  necessary to exercise the privileges of a Private pilot license or certificate, or any lower pilot certification level except for the FAA's Sport pilot certificate (which only requires the same medical clearance required to drive a car, as evidenced by a valid driver license). In the United States, a third-class medical expires after 60 calendar months for someone under the age of forty years (as of the date of examination), or 24 calendar months for someone over forty.
Second Class Medical Certificate:  necessary to exercise the privileges of a Commercial pilot license or certificate. In the United States, it expires after 12 calendar months regardless of the pilot's age.
First Class Medical Certificate:  necessary to exercise the privileges of an airline transport pilot license or certificate. Second-in-command privileges of an airline transport pilot certificate in part 121 require only a Second Class Medical Certificate. In the United States, it expires after 12 calendar months for a pilot under 40, 6 months for pilots over 40.

Medical certificates higher than the minimum requirement for a pilot license level still allow the holder to exercise the privileges at that level, even after the initial class of medical certification has expired. For instance, a pilot holding a valid first-class medical certificate may operate a plane with the privilege level of a private or commercial pilot. These privileges may be exercised until the date that a medical certificate of the minimum required class would expire; 9 months after issuance of a first-class medical, a pilot over 40 could still use the certificate to operate as a commercial or private/recreational pilot, and could still operate as a private or recreational pilot up to 2 years after issuance.

Flight physicals
Military and civilian pilots must pass routine periodic medical examinations known informally as "flight physicals" in order to retain the medical clearance or certification that qualifies them to fly.  Military pilots go to a flight surgeon, an armed forces physician qualified to perform such medical evaluations.  With the exception of glider pilots, balloon pilots, and sport-pilots, civilian pilots in the United States and most other nations must obtain a flight physical from a civilian physician known as an Aviation Medical Examiner (AME).  Aviation Medical Examiners (AME's) are physicians designated and trained by the FAA to screen individuals for fitness to perform aviation duties.  Pilot medical assessment by way of the flight physical is an important public health function.

Flying has the potential for serious consequences if not done properly and carefully. Just as it would be unwise to fly in an aircraft that is not airworthy, it is unsafe to fly as, or with, a pilot who is medically compromised. Annual inspections are performed on all aircraft to assure that they meet minimum safety standards. Routine medical exams accomplish the same goal for pilots. When an aircraft successfully completes an annual inspection, the inspector endorses in the logbooks to signify the aircraft is airworthy. Similarly, when a pilot successfully passes the flight physical, the physician endorses the Airmen Medical Certificate which the pilot then carries when performing flight duties. This is may be used as evidence that the pilot has met the medical standards for aircraft operation.

Types of flight physicals 

Federal Aviation Regulations in the U.S. require pilots and air traffic controllers to have periodic flight physicals in order to perform their aviation related duties.  Authority for these laws comes from the CFR (Code of Federal Regulations) parts 61 and 67.  Federal regulations describe three classes of medical certificates: Class 3 medical certificates are for private pilot duties only. They have the least restrictive medical requirements and the certificates are good for 5 years for applicants under age 40 and 2 years for those 40 and over. Class 2 medical certificates are for commercial, non-airline pilot-in-command duties as well as private pilot duties. This certificate would be required of crop dusters, charter pilots, corporate pilots, airline first officers and anyone else who flies commercially. The certificate is good for 1 year for commercial activities and 2 or 5 years for private pilot use based on age. Class 1 medical certificates are required for airline transport pilots who fly scheduled airliners as Pilot-in-Command. These are the most complex examinations and include electrocardiograms (EKGs). EKGs are required at the first Class 1 medical after the applicant turns 35 and then the first medical after age 40 and yearly thereafter.  Class 1 certificates are good for airline pilot-in-command duties for 1 year for applicants under age 40 and 6 months for those 40 and over. Like the Class 2 certificate, however, these remain good for a full year for other commercial activities and 2 or 5 years for private pilot duties.  Detailed medical requirements for each class of pilot exam are described in Code of Federal Regulations Part 67.

A newer pilot classification in the United States does not require a formal flight physical.  A pilot can fly a light-sport aircraft if they hold a Sport-pilot certificate or a recreational pilot certificate and have a U.S. driver' license from any state.  Pilots with neither a driver's license nor an Airmen Medical Certificate can still fly, but aviation duties are restricted to non-commercial activities in a glider or a balloon.  The pilot must self-endorse and certify that he/she has no known medical deficiencies which would render them incapable of piloting an aircraft. Sport-pilot medical requirements are described in detail in CFR 61.303.

Denial of medical certification 
Depending upon which Class certificate a pilot wants or needs, it is possible that either the Aviation Medical Examiner or the FAA may deny a pilot's medical certificate. This may be due to recent surgery, medication is taken, non-aviation-related offenses (such as drunk driving citations), or any other medical condition. Pilots may appeal denials up to and including formal appeals to the National Transportation Safety Board. The process of making an appeal includes meticulous documentation of a pilot's medical condition, therapies involved in treatment, and may be accompanied by psychological evaluations and/or other data. While any pilot may successfully make and receive approval via appeals, there are several professional organizations that exist to aid pilots in appealing the denial of a medical certificate. These include but are not limited to the Aircraft Owners and Pilots Association (www.AOPA.org), The Experimental Aircraft Association (www.EAA.org), Wingman Medical (www.wingmanmed.com) and Pilot Medical Solutions (www.Leftseat.com).

See also
  Civil Aerospace Medical Institute

Notes

External links
 
 Options following medical certificate denial from the NTSB
 FAA Medical Practice Test
 FAA MedXPress Simulator
 Guidelines for Medical Appeal from the FAA

Aviation licenses and certifications
Aviation medicine
Medicine in society
Federal Aviation Administration